Douglas dos Santos Justino de Melo (born 22 March 1994), known as Douglas Santos or simply Douglas, is a Brazilian professional footballer who plays as a left-back for Russian Premier League club Zenit Saint Petersburg.

Club career

Náutico
In 2011, after an unsuccessful trial at Corinthians, Douglas was signed by Náutico. A year later, he was called up to first team.

On 15 February 2012, Douglas Santos made his first team debut, in a 2–0 home win over Central. On the 26th, he scored his first professional goal, the second of a 3–1 home win over Belo Jardim.

On 18 July, he made his Série A debut, in a 3–0 home win over Ponte Preta. On 10 October, he scored his first top flight goal, in a 1–2 away defeat against Ponte Preta.

Granada and Udinese
On 12 July 2013, Douglas Santos signed a five-year deal with La Liga side Granada CF, for an undisclosed fee. On 2 September, he joined Udinese Calcio in a season-long loan deal.

Douglas Santos made his Serie A debut on 21 December 2013, starting in a 2–1 away win against A.S. Livorno. He made two further appearances for the club during the campaign, being permanently bought by the club in January 2014.

Atlético Mineiro
On 12 August 2014, Douglas Santos was loaned to Atlético Mineiro for 12 months. He made his debut for the club on 31 August.

On 20 July 2015, Galo signed Douglas Santos permanently for €3 million on a four-year contract.

Hamburger SV
On 31 August 2016, Douglas Santos signed for German club Hamburger SV. He played three seasons with the club, making 88 appearances and scoring three goals.

Zenit Saint Petersburg
On 4 July 2019, Douglas Santos joined Russian Premier League side FC Zenit Saint Petersburg, signing a five-year contract. On 3 September 2021, he extended his Zenit contract until the end of the 2025–26 season.

International career 
A few months before featuring with the U-20's winning squad in the 2013 Toulon Tournament, Douglas Santos received a call-up for the full squad on 2 April 2013, for a match against Bolivia. However, he did not leave the bench.

On 13 August 2015, Douglas Santos returned to the senior team, for friendlies against Costa Rica and the United States. He made his debut for his country in a 2016 friendly against Panama.

He also represented Brazil at the Rio Olympics winning the Olympic men's football tournament.

Career statistics

Honours

Club
Atlético Mineiro
 Copa do Brasil: 2014
 Campeonato Mineiro: 2015

Zenit Saint Petersburg
 Russian Premier League: 2019–20, 2020–21, 2021–22
 Russian Cup: 2019–20
 Russian Super Cup: 2020, 2021, 2022

International
Brazil
 Olympic Gold Medal: 2016

Brazil U20
 Toulon Tournament: 2013, 2014
 Valais Youth Cup: 2013

Individual
 Campeonato Brasileiro Série A Team of the Year: 2015
 Russian Premier League Top Assist Provider: 2020–21

References

External links

Profile at the FC Zenit Saint Petersburg website

1994 births
Living people
People from João Pessoa, Paraíba
Brazilian footballers
Brazil international footballers
Association football defenders
Campeonato Brasileiro Série A players
Clube Náutico Capibaribe players
Clube Atlético Mineiro players
Granada CF footballers
Serie A players
Udinese Calcio players
Bundesliga players
2. Bundesliga players
Hamburger SV players
FC Zenit Saint Petersburg players
Russian Premier League players
Brazil youth international footballers
Copa América Centenario players
Olympic footballers of Brazil
Footballers at the 2016 Summer Olympics
Olympic gold medalists for Brazil
Olympic medalists in football
Medalists at the 2016 Summer Olympics
Brazilian expatriate footballers
Brazilian expatriate sportspeople in Spain
Brazilian expatriate sportspeople in Italy
Brazilian expatriate sportspeople in Germany
Brazilian expatriate sportspeople in Russia
Expatriate footballers in Spain
Expatriate footballers in Italy
Expatriate footballers in Germany
Expatriate footballers in Russia
Sportspeople from Paraíba